The African People's Convention is a South African political party formed by Themba Godi, former deputy leader of the Pan-Africanist Congress of Azania (PAC) via floor-crossing legislation, on 4 September 2007. Godi defected along with the PAC's only two provincial representatives, Eastern Cape MPL Zingisa Mkabile and Gauteng MPL Malesela Ledwaba. Godi is the current leader of the APC. The party retained its seat in the National Assembly in the 2009 elections, although it lost both of its representatives in the provincial legislatures of Gauteng and Eastern Cape.

It retained its seat in the 2014 election, but lost it in the 2019 election.

Like the PAC, the party's ideology officially appeals to "Africanists, Pan Africanists and socialists".

Election results

National elections

|-
! Election
! Total votes
! Share of vote
! Seats 
! +/–
! Government
|-
! 2007 Floor-crossing
| —
| —
| 
|  2
| 
|-
! 2009
| 35,867
| 0.20%
| 
|  1
| 
|-
! 2014
| 30,676
| 0.17%
| 
|  0
| 
|-
! 2019
| 19,593
| 0.11%
| 
|  1
| 
|}

Provincial elections

! rowspan=2 | Election
! colspan=2 | Eastern Cape
! colspan=2 | Free State
! colspan=2 | Gauteng
! colspan=2 | Kwazulu-Natal
! colspan=2 | Limpopo
! colspan=2 | Mpumalanga
! colspan=2 | North-West
! colspan=2 | Northern Cape
! colspan=2 | Western Cape
|- 
! % !! Seats
! % !! Seats
! % !! Seats
! % !! Seats
! % !! Seats
! % !! Seats
! % !! Seats
! % !! Seats
! % !! Seats
|-
! 2009
| 0.20% || 0/63
| 0.31% || 0/30
| 0.12% || 0/73
| 0.15% || 0/80
| 0.30% || 0/49
| 0.37% || 0/30
| 0.29% || 0/33
| 0.34% || 0.30
| 0.09% || 0/42
|-
! 2014
| 0.23% || 0/63
| 0.32% || 0/30
| 0.16% || 0/73
| 0.18% || 0/80
| 0.35% || 0/49
| 0.44% || 0/30
| 0.40% || 0/33
| 0.28% || 0.30
| 0.06% || 0/42
|-
! 2019
| 0.13% || 0/63
| 0.15% || 0/30
| 0.07% || 0/73
| 0.10% || 0/80
| 0.36% || 0/49
| 0.34% || 0/30
| 0.13% || 0/33
| 0.15% || 0.30
| 0.04% || 0/42
|}

Municipal elections

|-
! Election
! Votes
! %
|-
! 2016
| 84,579
| 0.22%
|-
! 2021
| 58,358
| 0.19%
|-
|}

References

External links

African People's Convention

2007 establishments in South Africa
African and Black nationalist parties in Africa
African socialist political parties
Nationalist parties in South Africa
Political parties based in Johannesburg
Pan-Africanism in South Africa
Pan-Africanist political parties in Africa
Political parties established in 2007
Political parties in South Africa
Political parties in South Africa created by floor crossing
Socialist parties in South Africa